"Move On" is a song co-written and recorded by American country music duo The Warren Brothers.  It was released in October 2000 as the second single from the album King of Nothing.  The song reached #17 on the Billboard Hot Country Singles & Tracks chart.  The song was written by Brad Warren, Brett Warren and Danny Wilde.

Chart performance

Notes

References

2001 singles
2000 songs
The Warren Brothers songs
Songs written by the Warren Brothers
BNA Records singles
Song recordings produced by Chris Farren (country musician)